Michael Savage (born 9 September 1986) is a Gaelic football goalkeeper who plays for the St Vincent's club and for the Dublin county team.

References

1986 births
Living people
Dublin inter-county Gaelic footballers
Gaelic football goalkeepers
St Vincents (Dublin) Gaelic footballers
Winners of two All-Ireland medals (Gaelic football)